Sylvia Rose Moy (September 15, 1938 – April 15, 2017) was an American songwriter and record producer, formerly associated with the Motown Records group. The first woman at the Detroit-based music label to write and produce for Motown acts, she is probably best known for her songs written with and for Stevie Wonder.

Life and career
Born and brought up on the northeast side of Detroit, Moy studied and performed jazz and classical music at Northern High School, before she was seen performing in a club in 1963 by Marvin Gaye and Mickey Stevenson.  She was given recording and songwriting contracts by Motown, but was urged to prioritize her songwriting because the company was short of material for its artists.

According to Berry Gordy's autobiography To Be Loved, Moy was directly responsible for the label keeping Stevie Wonder. Gordy wrote that, after Stevie's voice began to change as a result of puberty, he was going to drop him from the label. It was then that Moy went to Gordy and asked "if she could come up with a hit for Stevie would he reconsider"; he agreed.  Her first writing success came with "Uptight (Everything's Alright)", which she co-wrote with Henry "Hank" Cosby after hearing Wonder improvising on piano.  Moy wrote lyrics to the song, which she conveyed to Wonder by singing into his headphones one line ahead as he recorded.

Among the subsequent hit singles Moy wrote and/or produced while at Motown were Stevie Wonder's "My Cherie Amour", "I Was Made to Love Her", and "Never Had a Dream Come True"; and "Honey Chile" and "Love Bug Leave My Heart Alone" by Martha and the Vandellas. She also co-wrote "This Old Heart of Mine (Is Weak for You)" with Holland-Dozier-Holland for the Isley Brothers; and "It Takes Two" with William "Mickey" Stevenson for Marvin Gaye and Kim Weston.

She later wrote theme songs for several television shows, and was involved in writing film music. She was inducted into the Songwriters Hall of Fame alongside fellow Motown songwriter and producer Hank Cosby in 2006.  She also set up a non-profit group, Center for Creative Communications, working with underprivileged children in Detroit.

Moy died of complications from pneumonia in Dearborn, Michigan, on April 15, 2017, at the age of 78.

Accolades 
In 1969, Moy won three BMI Awards for the songs "Honey Chile," "I Was Made to Love Her," and "Shoo-Be-Doo-Be-Doo-Da-Day."

Selective Discography

Singles

References

External links

 Adam White, "Sylvia and Stevie: inspiration and influence"

1938 births
2017 deaths
African-American songwriters
American women composers
Record producers from Michigan
Songwriters from Michigan
Motown artists
American women songwriters
Deaths from pneumonia in Michigan
American women record producers
Northern High School (Detroit, Michigan) alumni
African-American women musicians
20th-century African-American people
21st-century African-American people
20th-century African-American women
21st-century African-American women